Heinz Krenn (born 9 July 1947) is an Austrian bobsledder. He competed in the four man event at the 1976 Winter Olympics.

References

External links
 

1947 births
Living people
Austrian male bobsledders
Olympic bobsledders of Austria
Bobsledders at the 1976 Winter Olympics
People from Hall in Tirol
Sportspeople from Tyrol (state)